Florânia is a municipality in the state of Rio Grande do Norte in the Northeast region of Brazil.

According to IBGE (Instituto Brasileiro de Geografia e Estatística), the municipality had a population of 9,786 people in 2020.

List of Mayors:

See also 
 List of municipalities in Rio Grande do Norte

References 

Municipalities in Rio Grande do Norte